Budget purdah, in the United Kingdom, is the period after plans have been prepared but before the Chancellor of the Exchequer's annual budget is announced, when they refrain from discussing any matters which have relevance to the forthcoming budget.

Hugh Dalton 
Chancellor of the Exchequer Hugh Dalton resigned after he made "an off-the-cuff remark to a journalist, telling him of some of the tax changes" in the autumn 1947 budget speech.

See also
Purdah (pre-election period), the pre-election period in the United Kingdom

References

United Kingdom budgets